Mangelia amatula is a species of sea snail, a marine gastropod mollusk in the family Mangeliidae.

Description
The length of the shell attains 6.5 mm, its diameter 3 mm.

(Original description) The small shell is pale waxen yellow, with occasional brown spots between the ribs. It contains about 1½ smooth white whorls in the protoconch and about 5½ subsequent whorls. The axial sculpture consists of (on the body whorl eight) stout protractively arcuate ribs with subequal or narrower interspaces not continuous up the spire, but extending from the suture over a slight shoulder to the siphonal canal. The spiral sculpture consists of numerous fine sharp striae covering the shell (except on the anal fasciole) with flattish wider interspaces. There is a slight angle at the shoulder. The aperture is narrow. The outer lip is infolded. The anal sulcus is large. The siphonal canal is hardly differentiated. The columella is smooth.

Distribution
This marine species occurs off California, found at San Diego.

References

External links
  Tucker, J.K. 2004 Catalog of recent and fossil turrids (Mollusca: Gastropoda). Zootaxa 682:1–1295.
 

amatula
Gastropods described in 1919